Urbana is an unincorporated community in Neosho County, Kansas, United States.  As of the 2020 census, the population of the community and nearby areas was 30.

History
Urbana was platted in 1870. It was located on the Missouri Pacific Railroad.

A post office was opened in Urbana in 1870, and remained in operation until it was discontinued in 1957.

From 1877 to 1878 it was the sight of the short-lived "Esperanza Community", which was described as "a colony of communists." They bought a hotel and ran a newspaper called The Star of Hope.

Demographics

For statistical purposes, the United States Census Bureau has defined this community as a census-designated place (CDP).

References

Further reading

External links
 Neosho County maps: Current, Historic, KDOT

Unincorporated communities in Neosho County, Kansas
Unincorporated communities in Kansas